Pao abei is a species of freshwater pufferfish from the Mekong, Chao Phraya and Mae Klong river basins in Southeast Asia. It is named after Japanese ichthyologist Tokiharu Abe.

They are molluscivores, using the beak-like teeth to break open the shell of the prey. They are also opportunistic piscivores.

Maximum length is  SL. Numerous pale spots are uniformly distributed over a dark background. The spots are orange in certain live specimens.

In the aquarium this fish is very aggressive and territorial.

References

External links 
 Pictures of Tetraodon abei

Tetraodontidae
Fish described in 1998
Fish of the Mekong Basin
Fish of Cambodia
Fish of Laos
Fish of Thailand